Mount Fitzgerald is the fourth-highest named mountain in the Ruby Mountains and the fifth-highest in Elko County, in Nevada, United States. It is the thirty-ninth-highest mountain in the state. It rises from the heads of both Thomas and Right Fork Canyons (branches of Lamoille Canyon), and is also part of the north wall of Box Canyon, making it a true glacial horn.

References

External links

Mountains of Elko County, Nevada
Ruby Mountains
Mountains of Nevada
Humboldt–Toiyabe National Forest